Voice to New World is the debut extended play by South Korean boy group Victon. The EP was released on November 9, 2016, by Plan A Entertainment.

Background and release 
After the finale of their pre-debut reality show Me & 7 Men, a teaser was aired on November 1, 2016, featuring Apink member Son Na-eun, revealing the group's official debut date to be November 9. On November 4, a performance trailer for "What Time Is It Now?" was released, a track from their first EP.

The album tells a story of a boy who's being disregarded and neglected by his girlfriend but can't help but stay with her. The album is described to have a pop funk sound throughout the songs. On November 9, Victon made their debut with the release of their first EP Voice to New World along with the title track "I'm Fine." The group performed both "I'm Fine" and "What Time Is It Now?" on music shows for their promotions.

Track listing

Charts

Weekly charts

Monthly charts

Sales

References

2016 debut EPs
Victon EPs
Korean-language EPs